William Archibald Mackintosh,  (May 21, 1895 – December 29, 1970) was a Canadian economist and political scientist, and was the twelfth principal of Queen's University from 1951 until 1961. He is best known for developing the staple thesis that explains Canadian economic history in terms of a series of exports of staple products – fish, fur, timber, and wheat.

Born in Madoc, Ontario, he received his BA and MA from Queen's in 1916. He received his PhD from Harvard University.

From 1922 to 1939 he was a professor of economics at Queen's. During the Second World War, he was an assistant to the Deputy Minister of Finance in Ottawa and later in the Department of Reconstruction and Supply. He was appointed a Companion of the Order of St Michael and St George in 1946.

After the war he was the dean of arts and science at Queen's until becoming principal in 1951, the first principal who was a Queen's graduate. He was a director of the Bank of Canada and a member of its executive committee.

In 1967 he was made a Companion of the Order of Canada and received the Innis-Gérin Medal, awarded for a distinguished and sustained contribution to the literature of the social sciences, from the Royal Society of Canada, of which he was a fellow and was president from 1956 to 1957.

Mackintosh-Corry Hall at Queen's is co-named in his honour.

He married Jean Isobel Easton (1902–1983) in 1928.

References

Further reading
 

1895 births
1970 deaths
Canadian economists
Companions of the Order of Canada
Fellows of the Royal Society of Canada
Harvard University alumni
Writers from Ontario
People from Hastings County
Principals of Queen's University at Kingston
Queen's University at Kingston alumni
Academic staff of the Queen's University at Kingston
Canadian people of Scottish descent
Canadian Companions of the Order of St Michael and St George
Presidents of the Canadian Political Science Association
20th-century political scientists